Ellington Is Forever Volume Two is an album by guitarist Kenny Burrell featuring compositions associated with Duke Ellington recorded in 1975 and released on the Fantasy Records label. Originally released as a double album set in 1977 it was rereleased on CD in 1994.

Reception
Allmusic awarded the album 4½ stars stating "Burrell's initial plan was to release a volume in tribute to Ellington once a year, but this record and the one that preceded it were the only two albums in this proposed series that were ever made. One can only imagine what could have been if Burrell had continued. Alternately, and more positively, one can be glad that the only records that were released were as beautiful and as close to perfection as these two".

Track listing 
All compositions by Duke Ellington except as indicated
 "Azure" (Duke Ellington, Irving Mills) - 1:50     
 "Take the "A" Train" (Billy Strayhorn) - 7:37     
 "In a Sentimental Mood" - 5:30     
 "I'm Beginning to See the Light" (Ellington, Don George, Johnny Hodges, Harry James) - 4:17     
 "Satin Doll" - 3:32     
 "I'm Just a Lucky So-and-So" - 5:37     
 "In a Mellow Tone" - 5:47     
 "Solitude" - 3:19     
 "The Jeep Is Jumpin'" (Ellington, Johnny Hodges) - 4:57     
 "I Let a Song Go Out of My Heart" - 6:56     
 "Prelude to a Kiss" - 2:55     
 "Satin Doll (Segue)" (Ellington, Strayhorn) - 0:21     
 "Come Sunday" - 3:10     
 "Just Squeeze Me (But Please Don't Tease Me)" - 8:01     
 "I Ain't Got Nothin' But the Blues" - 7:45     
 "Orson" - 3:36

Personnel 
Kenny Burrell - guitar 
Nat Adderley - cornet
Thad Jones, Snooky Young - trumpet
Quentin Jackson - trombone, vocals
Gary Bartz - alto saxophone, soprano saxophone, clarinet
Joe Henderson - tenor saxophone
Jerome Richardson - tenor saxophone, soprano saxophone
Roland Hanna, Jimmy Jones - piano
Jimmy Smith - organ
Stanley Gilbert, Monk Montgomery, George Mraz - bass
Philly Joe Jones (tracks 3, 4, 7, 9, 10, 15), Jimmie Smith (tracks 2, 5, 6, 8, 14) - drums
Ernie Andrews - vocals

References 

Kenny Burrell albums
1977 albums
Fantasy Records albums
Duke Ellington tribute albums